Zenith Insurance Company is an American insurance company headquartered in California specializing in workers' compensation insurance.  It has been an indirect wholly owned subsidiary of Canadian Fairfax Financial since 2010.
Zenith operates nationally in the workers' compensation insurance business and conducts business through independent agencies and brokers.

History
Zenith National Insurance Corporation was established in 1949. In 1971, Zenith went public and was listed on the NASDAQ stock market. In 1978, Stanley Zax was hired as Zenith's chief executive officer. In 1987, the company was listed on the NYSE under the ticker symbol ZNT.

In 2010, Fairfax Financial agreed to buy Zenith in a deal that valued the company at around $1.3 billion US. The deal was negotiated by Fairfax CEO Prem Watsa. A group of Zenith shareholders sought to prevent the sale by going to court, but a court dismissed their claims on April 22, 2010. The combined company became seventh-largest workers’ compensation insurer in California.

In 2015, the company was part of a settlement with the city of San Mateo arising from the collapse of Lehman Brothers.

References

1949 establishments in California
American companies established in 1949
Financial services companies established in 1949
2010 mergers and acquisitions
Financial services companies based in California
Companies based in Los Angeles
Insurance companies of the United States
American subsidiaries of foreign companies
Companies formerly listed on the Nasdaq
Fairfax Financial